Weather is the fifth studio album by ambient music project Tycho, released on July 12, 2019. The album was preceded by the release of the singles "Easy" and "Pink & Blue", the latter of which was released along with the album announcement on May 14, 2019. Tycho will embark on a world tour in late 2019 and into 2020 in support of the album.

Being the first Tycho album to feature a vocalist, Weather was nominated for a Grammy Award at the 62nd Annual Grammy Awards in the Best Dance/Electronic Album category, losing out to The Chemical Brothers' album No Geography.

Background
Magnetic Magazine characterized the album's sound as different from the trilogy of Dive, Awake and Epoch in that while "the airy guitars, synths and percussion are still largely there", they have been "adapted for a bit more of an organic, indie rock template", with vocals from Saint Sinner on five of the album's eight tracks. Hansen described the album as a collaboration with Saint Sinner, saying that he "wanted to finally fulfill what had been a vision of mine since the beginning: to incorporate the most organic instrument of all, the human voice".

Track listing

Charts

References

2019 albums
Tycho (musician) albums
Ninja Tune albums
Mom + Pop Music albums